Vamarzan (also Romanized as Vāmarzān and Vāmarzan) is a village in Howmeh Rural District, in the Central District of Damghan County, Semnan Province, Iran. At the 2006 census, its population was 343, in 102 families.

References 

Populated places in Damghan County